Manor House School may refer to:
Manor House School, Cairo, Egypt
Manor House School, Little Bookham, England
Manor House School, Raheny, Ireland
The Eaton House Group of Schools#Manor House School, London, England